Sri Trivikrama Panditacharya (1258 - 1320), was an Indian scholar and one of the disciples of Sri Madhvacharya, the great Dvaita philosopher. He composed the Vayu Stuti, one of the most famous Stotras in the Madhva tradition.

Biography
Sri Trivikrama Panditacharya's biographical account is also given with considerable detail by his son Sri Narayana Panditacharya in Sri MadhwaVijaya. Sri Trvivikrama Panditacharya's father was Sri Subramanya Panditacharya.

Sri Trivikrama Panditacharya was a scholar even in his young days and even before he was converted as a Madhwa he had written a Sanskrit mahakavya called "Ushaharana" mahakavya.

Sri Trivikrama Panditacharya was the teacher of the King of Kasaragod called Jayasimha. Once when Sri Madhvacharya visited Kasaragod, he challenged Sri Madhva to a debate, as he believed in the Advaita tradition. The debate lasted for 7–8 days and in the end, he accepted Sri Madhva's philosophy and became his disciple. He also composed a book called Tatva pradeepika, which is a commentary of Sri Madhvacharya's Brahma Sutra Bhashya.

Sri Trivikrama Panditacharya's son, Narayana Panditacharya, composed the famous Madhwavijaya, the biography of Sri Madhvacharya.

Works
Trikirama Pandita composed a kaavya 'Ushaharana' in his teenage. There have been others works accredited to Panditacharya, of which a book called Tattvapradeepa, which is a commentary of Sri Madhvacharya's Brahma Sutra Bhashya and Vayu Stuti are most notable.
The attributed works are: 
 Vayu Stuti 
 Vishnu Stuti'
 Narasimha Stuti 
 Ushaharana Madhwa Stotra Tattvapradeepa''

Brindavana

Brindavana of Sri Trivikrama Panditacharya is located at Kavu Mutt near Kudlu in Kerala (near Kasaragod town in Kerala - Around 60 km from Mangalore City)

See also

 Dvaita Literature

References

Bibliography

Footnotes
Sri Madhvacharya

Indian male poets
Dvaita Vedanta
Dvaitin philosophers
Poets from Kerala